Peter Andre: My Life is a British television fly on the wall reality television series, broadcast on ITV2, that focuses on Australian singer and television personality Peter Andre, as cameras follow him throughout his everyday life. Originally born from a pilot entitled Peter Andre: Going it Alone, which focused on his divorce from model Katie Price, ten series of the programme were broadcast.

The first four series were known as The Next Chapter, the final five as My Life, and a single series as Here 2 Help, which saw Peter take time out from his private life to help those in need. Including the pilot, the first episode was broadcast on ITV2 on 17 August 2009. The final episode broadcast on 23 December 2013. Aside from the final episode of Here 2 Help, every single episode of the series ranked in the top 10 programmes broadcast on ITV2 that week.

Episodes

Pilot
 This one-off special was 90-minutes long and earned one of ITV2's highest ever ratings, earning a peak of 1.9 million viewers. Following the success of the episode, Andre stated that a full series had been commissioned and was slated to air in November 2009.

Series 1: The Next Chapter (2009)
 Commissioned by ITV2 in August 2009.

Series 2: The Next Chapter II (2010)
 Commissioned by ITV2 in January 2010.

Series 3: The Next Chapter III (2010)
 Commissioned by ITV2 in June 2010.

Series 4: The Next Chapter IV (2011)
 Commissioned by ITV2 in December 2010.

Series 5: Here 2 Help (2011)
 During his time off from recording The Next Chapter, and whilst the series was receiving a major overhaul, Andre recorded a special six-part series entitled Here 2 Help, in which he visited six different locations in the United Kingdom and helped a certain group of people in one way or another to achieve a better life.

Series 6: My Life (2011)
 In 2011, the series received a complete overhaul, being re-titled My Life and receiving new opening titles and theme. The series was commissioned by ITV2 in June 2011.

Series 7: My Life II (2012)

Series 8: My Life III (2012—2013)
 Episode three was originally due to be aired on 19 December 2012, but due to the death of Andre's brother, Andrew, was postponed and broadcast a week later. Thus, episodes four and five were also broadcast a week late.

Series 9: My Life IV (2013)

Series 10: My Life V (2013)
 Andre confirmed prior to broadcast that this series would be his last series on ITV2. This series was extended to 11 episodes to make up for a shorter eighth series.

References

External links
 

2009 British television series debuts
2013 British television series endings
British reality television series
ITV (TV network) original programming
Peter Andre
Television series by ITV Studios
English-language television shows